David Norman Angel KC (born 5 July 1944) was a Judge of the Supreme Court of the Northern Territory, Australia.  He was appointed to the court on 8 May 1989.  Justice Angel retired on 20 January 2010. At the time of his retirement he was the Northern Territory's longest serving resident Judge.

Education and legal work
Justice Angel was educated at Prince Alfred College in South Australia and later attended the University of Adelaide.  He was admitted to the South Australian Bar in 1967 and practised as a partner with the Adelaide law firm of Piper, Bakewell and Piper until 1974.  In 1975 Justice Angel joined the South Australian Independent Bar where he remained until taking up his appointment on the Northern Territory Supreme Court bench.   
 
He was appointed as a Queen's Counsel in 1981.

On 24 May 2010, he was granted the title "Honourable" for life.

Other interests
Justice Angel was President of the South Australian Bar Association (1988–89) and Chairman of the South Australian Parole Board (1982–84).  Justice Angel was also a Council Member of the South Australian Law Society, a member of the South Australian Disciplinary Tribunal and a member of the South Australian Supreme Court Admissions Board.  Justice Angel is also a member of the Governing Council of the Judicial Conference of Australia  and is a Patron the Arts Law Centre of Australia .

External links
 Official biography
 Judicial Conference of Australia
 Arts Law Centre of Australia

Australian King's Counsel
Living people
People educated at Prince Alfred College
People from Darwin, Northern Territory
Judges of the Supreme Court of the Northern Territory
1944 births